The 2020 European Table Tennis Championships were held in Warsaw, Poland, from 22 to 27 June 2021.

The championships were originally scheduled to be held from 15 to 20 September 2020, but were postponed because to the COVID-19 pandemic in Poland.

Medal summary

Medallists

Medal table

References

External links

International Table Tennis Federation
European Table Tennis Union

2020
European Championships
Table Tennis
European Table Tennis Championships
International sports competitions hosted by Poland
Sports competitions in Warsaw
European Table Tennis Championships
European Table Tennis Championships